"The Bones" is a song recorded by American country music singer Maren Morris for her second studio album, Girl. Morris co-wrote the song with Jimmy Robbins and Laura Veltz, and it was produced by Greg Kurstin. "The Bones" was released digitally as a promotional single on February 22, 2019, and was later serviced to hot adult contemporary radio on May 20, 2019, as the album's second single. The song became a sleeper hit, peaking at number 12 on the Billboard Hot 100 chart in 2020. The song ended up being the second-biggest country song of 2020 in the US. It is certified four-times platinum in the US.

The song was nominated at the 63rd Grammy Awards for Best Country Song, earning Morris her twelfth nomination. The single won two Country Music Association awards (one for single of the year 2020 and one for song of the year 2020) and one Academy of Country Music award (for song of the year 2021).

Critical reception
Jason Fontelieu praised the songwriting behind "The Bones" and in a review of its parent album wrote that "despite a clumsy midsection, Girl finishes strong with "The Bones" near the end of the album." Mike Wass of Idolator wrote that the harmonies in the Hozier remix "elevates [the song] to a rawer, more emotional place." Billy Dukes of Taste of Country called the song "a soulful pop anthem with a hint of country thrown in for good measure."

Commercial performance
"The Bones" debuted at number 34 on the Billboard Hot Country Songs chart dated March 9, 2019, and later debuted at number 57 on the Billboard Country Airplay chart dated August 31, 2019 after its release to country radio. It reached number one on the Country Airplay chart dated February 15, 2020, becoming Morris's fourth number one single on the chart and the first solo song by a female country artist to reach the top 10 of the Billboard Radio Songs chart since Taylor Swift's "You Belong with Me". It spent a second week at the top, not only giving Morris her first multi-week number one single, but also making her the first solo female artist to chart a multi-week number one since Carrie Underwood's "Blown Away" spent two weeks at the top in late 2012. It reached number one in its 53rd week on the Hot Country Songs chart dated March 14, 2020, becoming the singer's first song to top that chart, as well as making for the second slowest climb to number one on that chart. Furthermore, it made Morris the first solo female artist to top that chart since Kelsea Ballerini's "Peter Pan" in October 2016. On the chart dated May 23, 2020, it charted its 11th week at number one, passing Swift's "We Are Never Ever Getting Back Together", which spent 10 weeks at number one in October 2012, as the longest-lasting number one by a solo female on that chart. It ultimately spent 19 weeks at number one before being replaced by Gabby Barrett's "I Hope", making it the first time since 2011 that two back-to-back solo women topped the Hot Country Songs chart. The song has crossed over to pop and rock radio, becoming Morris's first single to appear on the Adult Alternative Songs chart, where it has peaked at number 17. It has become Morris's highest charting solo song on the Billboard Hot 100 so far, peaking at number 12.

Despite not reaching the top 10 of the Billboard Hot 100, "The Bones" placed at number 9 on the year-end list for 2020. This is the first time that a song had not reached the top 10 of the Hot 100 but instead reached the top 10 of the year-end list since "I Don't Want to Wait" by Paula Cole in 1998.

"The Bones" was certified Gold by the RIAA on July 17, 2019, for 500,000 units in combined sales and streams. The song has sold 195,000 copies in the United States as of March 2020. The song has also been certified 7× Platinum by Music Canada as of July 2022. "The Bones" charted for 52 weeks on Billboard Hot 100 as of the issue dated September 26, 2020, becoming the 74th song to spend at least 52 weeks on the chart.

Music video
The music video for "The Bones" premiered on August 15, 2019. It was directed by Alex Ferrari and shows footage of Morris while on vacation in Maui, Hawaii with her husband, Ryan Hurd, all shot on vintage Super 8 film.

A video for the remix premiered on October 23 and features a time lapse of artist Sydney Clawson drawing both artists on canvas.

Awards and nominations

Charts

Weekly charts

Year-end charts

Certifications

Release history

See also
List of Billboard Adult Contemporary number ones of 2020

References

2019 songs
2019 singles
Maren Morris songs
Columbia Nashville Records singles
Songs written by Jimmy Robbins
Song recordings produced by Greg Kurstin
Songs written by Laura Veltz
Songs written by Maren Morris